The following is a list of the highest-grossing films in the United States and Canada, a market known in the film industry as the "North American box office", and where "gross" is defined in US dollars.

Not adjusted for inflation 
This is a list of the highest-grossing films in the U.S. and Canada, a market known in the film industry as the North American box office, or as the domestic box office within the U.S. itself. The chart is ranked by lifetime gross, and for comparison, the figures adjusted for the effects of inflation are also listed, using the U.S. consumer price index; a film's earnings from its initial release are also included to provide a basis for comparison between films released around the same time.

 These films fall outside the top 100 when considering only initial gross, and would be replaced by The Sixth Sense ($293.50) and Up ($293m).

Adjusted for ticket-price inflation
This chart ranks films by gross adjusted for ticket price inflation up to 2020 levels, based on data from Box Office Mojo, which was last updated in 2019 based on an average domestic movie ticket price of $9.01, and applying the Template:Inflation for the following years up to 2021 levels, due to the lack of updates on the original source. It was compiled by multiplying the average ticket price in the current year by an estimate of the total number of admissions. Where the number of admissions is unknown, they are estimated by dividing the nominal gross by the average ticket price in the year of release to provide an estimate (taking re-releases into account). Admissions better reflect the popularity of older films, since they are less susceptible to the effects of inflation.

Many of the films on this list were released prior to the availability of home video and have had multiple releases.

Factors in determining "adjusted gross"
No one yet has calculated a truly precise and definite referential adjusted gross for a film, since doing so would have to take into account most (or all) of the following:
 Box office gross on initial release
 Ticket price at time of release, or its relative price to other commodities in a given year, in relation to general inflation and gross domestic product.
 economic conditions that may help or hurt the entertainment industry as a whole (theaters in 2008 lowered ticket prices to attract more viewers though the average ticket cost $7.00)
 Population at time of release—to be used to calculate:
 Availability of films (number of theaters and screens, number of prints)
 Competition of other media (television, internet, home video, film piracy)
 Total number of films in the marketplace at a given time
 Screen quotas (no influence on U.S. box office)
 Price differences: matinee and evening tickets, roadshow tickets, or difference between rural and urban cinemas
 Length of release (number of weeks)

Further explanation of issues with calculating an adjusted gross can be found in the article for List of highest-grossing films.

Franchises and film series not adjusted for inflation 
This is a list of highest-grossing franchises and film series in the U.S. and Canada.

Franchises and film series adjusted for inflation 
This chart ranks films by gross adjusted for ticket price inflation up to 2020 levels, based on data from Box Office Mojo, and applying the Template:Inflation for the following years up to 2021 levels, due to the lack of updates on the original source.

See also
List of best-selling films in the United States
Lists of highest-grossing films
List of highest-grossing American films by year

Notes

References

Franchise and series sources

 Avengers
 
 Batman
 
 
 "Big Rental Pictures of 1966", Variety, 4 January 1967 p 8
 DC Extended Universe
 
 The Fast and the Furious
 
 Indiana Jones
 
 
 James Bond
 
 
 Jurassic Park
 
 
 Marvel Cinematic Universe
 
 Middle-earth
 
 
 
 
 
 Pirates of the Caribbean
 
 Rocky
 
 Shrek
 
 Spider-Man
 
 
 Star Trek
 
 Star Wars
 
 Superman
 
 
 Toy Story
 
 Transformers
 
 Wizarding World
 
 X-Men

External links
 
 

Highest-grossing
Highest-grossing
Highest-grossing
Highest-grossing
United States and Canada